Delaware Flats is a historic apartment building located at Indianapolis, Indiana.  It was built in 1887, and is a three-story, ten bay wide, Classical Revival style painted brick and limestone building.  The first floor has commercial storefronts with cast iron framing. The upper stories feature two-story blank arches with Corinthian order pilasters.

It was listed on the National Register of Historic Places in 1983.  It is located in the Washington Street-Monument Circle Historic District.

References

Apartment buildings in Indiana
Individually listed contributing properties to historic districts on the National Register in Indiana
Residential buildings on the National Register of Historic Places in Indiana
Neoclassical architecture in Indiana
Residential buildings completed in 1887
Residential buildings in Indianapolis
National Register of Historic Places in Indianapolis